Ekaterina Vladimirovna Kozireva (born 16 February 1993) is a Russian former competitive figure skater. She won silver at the 2009 Golden Spin of Zagreb and bronze at the 2006 ISU Junior Grand Prix event held in Miercurea Ciuc, Romania. She was the second alternate to the 2006 Junior Grand Prix Final.

Competitive highlights

References

External links

 
 Ekaterina Kozireva at Tracings.net

Russian female single skaters
1993 births
Living people
21st-century Russian women